Tuklaty is a municipality and village in Kolín District in the Central Bohemian Region of the Czech Republic. It has about 1,100 inhabitants.

Administrative parts
The village of Tlustovousy is an administrative part of Tuklaty.

References

Villages in Kolín District